There have been four baronetcies created for persons with the surname Preston, two in the Baronetage of Nova Scotia, one in the Baronetage of England and another in the Baronetage of the United Kingdom.

The Preston Baronetcy, of Airdrie in the County of Fife, was created in the Baronetage of Nova Scotia on 22 February 1628 for John Preston. The descent after the death of the fourth Baronet sometime after 1701 and the accession of Robert Preston in 1784 is uncertain. The title became dormant on the latter's death in c. 1792.

The Preston Baronetcy, of Valleyfield in the County of Perth, was created in the Baronetage of Nova Scotia on 13 March 1637 for George Preston. The fifth Baronet sat as Member of Parliament for Kirkcaldy Burghs. The title became dormant on the death of the ninth Baronet in 1873. George Preston, a great-nephew of the first baronet and father of the seventh baronet, was a lieutenant-general and colonel of the Scots Greys.

The Preston Baronetcy, of Furness in the County of Lancaster, was created in the Baronetage of England on 1 April 1644 for George Preston, descended from the de Preston family which during the reign of King Henry II (1154-1189) was seated at Preston Richard and Preston Patrick in Westmorland. The title became extinct on the death of the third Baronet in 1709.

The Preston Baronetcy, of Beeston St Lawrence in the County of Norfolk, was created in the Baronetage of the United Kingdom on 30 May 1815 for Thomas Hulton Preston. Born Thomas Hulton, he was the son of Henry Hulton and his wife Elizabeth, daughter of Isaac Preston of Beeston St Lawrence, whose estates he inherited. In 1804 he assumed the surname of Preston in lieu of his patronymic. The second Baronet served as High Sheriff of Norfolk in 1847.

Preston baronets, of Airdrie (1628)
Sir John Preston, 1st Baronet (died )
Sir John Preston, 2nd Baronet (died 1660)
Sir John Preston, 3rd Baronet (died 1675)
Sir John Preston, 4th Baronet (died after 1701)

succession unclear until 1784

Sir Robert Preston, ? Baronet ( – )

Preston baronets, of Valleyfield (1637)

Sir George Preston, 1st Baronet (died 1679)
Sir William Preston, 2nd Baronet
Sir George Preston, 3rd Baronet (–1741)
Sir George Preston, 4th Baronet (died 1779)
Sir Charles Preston, 5th Baronet (–1800)
Sir Robert Preston, 6th Baronet (1740–1834)
Sir Robert Preston, 7th Baronet (1757–1846) (son of George Preston)
Sir Robert Preston, 8th Baronet (c. 1780–1858) (grandson of George Preston)
Sir Henry Lindsay Preston, 9th Baronet (1789–1873) (grandson of George Preston)

Preston baronets, of Furness (1644)

Sir John Preston, 1st Baronet (1617–1645)
Sir John Preston, 2nd Baronet (died 1663)
Sir Thomas Preston, 3rd Baronet (–1709)

Preston baronets, of Beeston St Lawrence (1815)
Sir Thomas Hulton Preston, 1st Baronet (1767–1823)
Sir Jacob Henry Preston, 2nd Baronet (1812–1891)
Sir Henry Jacob Preston, 3rd Baronet (1851–1897)
Sir Jacob Preston, 4th Baronet (1887–1918)
Sir Edward Hulton Preston, 5th Baronet (1888–1963)
Sir Thomas Hildebrand Preston, 6th Baronet (1886–1976)
Sir Ronald Douglas Hildebrand Preston, 7th Baronet (1916–1999)
Sir Philip Charles Henry Hulton Preston, 8th Baronet (1946–2021)
Sir Philip Thomas Henry Preston, 9th Baronet (born 1990)

Notes

References
G. E. C. (editor), The Complete Baronetage, volume II (Exeter: William Pollard & Co, 1902)
Kidd, Charles, Williamson, David (editors). Debrett's Peerage and Baronetage (1990 edition). New York: St Martin's Press, 1990, 

Preston
Dormant baronetcies in the Baronetage of Nova Scotia
Extinct baronetcies in the Baronetage of England